Méba-Mickaël Zeze (born 19 May 1994) is a French sprinter who specialises in the 100 and 200 metres. He won the bronze medal at the 2011 World Youth Championships in Athletics in Lille Métropole, France. Earlier that year, Zézé broke the French Youth Record over 200 m, previously held by Christophe Lemaitre.

Personal best

References

External links

FFA profile for Mickaël Zézé

1994 births
Living people
French male sprinters
European Athletics Championships medalists
Olympic athletes of France
Athletes (track and field) at the 2016 Summer Olympics
World Athletics Championships athletes for France
Sportspeople from Seine-Maritime
Mediterranean Games bronze medalists for France
Mediterranean Games medalists in athletics
Athletes (track and field) at the 2018 Mediterranean Games
Athletes (track and field) at the 2020 Summer Olympics